Clark Laidlaw (born 16 July 1977) is currently the head coach of the New Zealand national rugby sevens team. Laidlaw was appointed as All Blacks Sevens Head Coach in 2017.

Biography 
Laidlaw is the son of former British & Irish Lions and Scotland international rugby union player Roy Laidlaw. His cousin, Greig Laidlaw, also represented the British & Irish Lions and Scotland. He represented Scotland internationally in sevens and moved to New Zealand in 2008.

Laidlaw was the Skills Coach and Video Analyst with the New Zealand sevens team under Tietjens from 2010 to 2012. He then returned to Taranaki in 2010 and became their Skills Coach. He was the Assistant Coach of the Hurricanes from 2013 to 2015. He was also Assistant Coach of the London Irish. In 2018, a year after becoming Head Coach, New Zealand won gold at the 2018 Commonwealth Games and the 2018 Rugby World Cup Sevens.

In 2021, Laidlaw guided New Zealand to a silver medal at the Tokyo Olympics.

References 

1977 births
Living people
Scotland international rugby sevens players
British rugby union coaches
Scottish rugby union coaches
British Olympic coaches
New Zealand national rugby sevens team coaches
Coaches of international rugby sevens teams